Bay High School is an accredited comprehensive public high school located in Bay, Arkansas, United States. The school provides secondary education for students in grades 7 through 12. It is one of six public high schools in Craighead County, Arkansas and the sole high school administered by the Bay School District.

Academics 
Bay High School is a Title I school that is accredited by the ADE and has been accredited by AdvancED since 1997.

Annually, the College of Agriculture & Technology (COAT) at Arkansas State University (ASU) administers the Mr. & Mrs. W. W. Holmes Memorial Scholarship for an incoming freshman majoring in agriculture with preference to students from Bay, Arkansas.

Curriculum 
The assumed course of study follows the Smart Core curriculum developed by the Arkansas Department of Education (ADE), which requires students complete at least 22 units prior to graduation. Students complete regular coursework and exams and may take Advanced Placement (AP) courses and exam with the opportunity to receive college credit.

Athletics 
The Bay High School mascot is the Yellowjacket with purple and gold serving as the school colors.

The Bay Yellowjackets compete in interscholastic activities within the 1A Classification, the state's smallest classification, and within the 1A Region 3 East Conference administered by the Arkansas Activities Association. The Yellowjackets field junior varsity and varsity teams in golf (boys/girls), volleyball, basketball (boys/girls), track and field (boys/girls), baseball, and softball, along with cheer and dance.

The Bay Yellowjackets have enjoyed success on the basketball court and baseball field:

 Basketball: The Yellowjackets boys basketball team are 3-time state basketball champions (1965, 2011, 2013).
 Baseball: In 1956, the Bay High School baseball went undefeated at 10–0.

Notable alumni 
Wally Moon - MLB Player (STL, LAD)

References

External links 
 

Public high schools in Arkansas
Public middle schools in Arkansas
Schools in Craighead County, Arkansas
1897 establishments in Arkansas